Baghalchur or Baghal Chor is a village in Dera Ghazi Khan District, Punjab, Pakistan. The Pakistan Atomic Energy Commission (PAEC) has allegedly used the area, originally the site of Uranium mines, as a nuclear dump. The residents of the area have complained about the nuclear dump and its effects on the people living in the area.

See also 

Nuclear waste
Fuel extraction in Pakistan

References

Villages in Dera Ghazi Khan District
Nuclear power in Pakistan
Nuclear history of Pakistan